Legislative Council elections were held in Punjab Province in British India in late 1926. They were the third legislative council elections held in the province under the Government of India Act 1919. The newly elected Council was constituted on 3 January 1927 when its first meeting was held.

Shahab-ud-Din Virk was re-elected as President on 4 January 1927. The Council was given the extension of about 7 months in its three years town and was dissolved on 26 July 1930. The Council held 111 meetings during its extended tenure.

Distribution of seats

Special^ (Non-Territorial)

 Punjab Landholders - 3
 General - 1
 Mohammadan - 1
 Sikh - 1
 Baluch Tumandars - 1
 Punjab Universities - 1
 Punjab Commerce and Trade - 1
 Punjab Industry - 1

Election schedule

 Election schedule in special constituencies were not same and the dates were different, unfortunately not available.

Category wise result

Special (7)
Landholders (3)
General (1)
Hindu Election Board - 1
Mohammadans (1)
Unionist Party - 1
Sikh (1)
Unionist Party - 1
Baluch Tumandars (1)
Unionist Party - 1
Punjab Universities (1)
Independent - 1
Punjab Commerce and Trade (1)
Independent -1 
Punjab Industries(1)
Independent - 1

Result

Constituency wise result
Color Keys for the Party of winner
 Unionist Party
 Hindu Election Board
 Central Sikh League
 Khilafatists
 Indian National Congress
 Independent
Other keys
 Candidate Elected Unopposed 

General-Urban

General-Rural

Muhammadan-Urban

Muhammadan-Rural

Sikh-Urban

Sikh-Rural

Special

Office bearer

Ex-Officio member and Ministers

Ministers

See also
 Punjab Legislative Council (British India)

References

External links

State Assembly elections in Punjab, India
1926 elections in India